The women's 400 metres at the 2016 IPC Athletics European Championships was held at the Stadio Olimpico Carlo Zecchini in Grosseto from 11–16 June.

Medalists

See also
List of IPC world records in athletics

References

400 metres
2016 in women's athletics
400 metres at the World Para Athletics European Championships